was a Japanese sociologist, cultural critic, and prominent public intellectual. He taught sociology for many years Gakushūin University.

Early life

Shimizu was born in the Nihonbashi district of Tokyo in 1907, the son of a bamboo dealer. After graduating with a degree in sociology from Tokyo Imperial University in 1931, he secured a job as a research assistant in the Department of Sociology at the same university. During Japan's war years, he worked for the government think tank Shōwa Kenkyūkai, wrote editorials for the Yomiuri Shinbun, and in the final years of the war worked for the Navy Technical Research Institute. An ardent nationalist through the end of the war, Shimizu was said to have broken down in tears when he heard of Japan's surrender. In 1949, he was appointed professor of sociology at Gakushūin University, where he would continue to teach before taking early retirement amid the 1969 student riots. Shimizu's 1948 textbook Lectures on Sociology is considered a classic in the field and was the first comprehensive Japanese textbook on sociology produced in the postwar period.

Postwar political activism

In the early postwar period, Shimizu was an active participant in the so-called "subjectivity debates." He then became extremely active in the movement against the US-Japan alliance and US military bases in Japan during the 1950s. Shimizu was a prominent member, alongside other progressive intellectuals such as Maruyama Masao, of the "Peace Problems Discussion Group (Heiwa Mondai Danwakai), which played a crucial role in providing theoretical underpinnings for the Japanese pacifist and neutralist movements. Shimizu was also seen as the guiding light of the first major anti-base protest movement in Japan following the end of the US military occupation, at Uchinada village in Ishikawa prefecture, against the establishment of a US military artillery range.

Shimizu was also a leading figure during the massive 1960 Anpo protests against the US-Japan Security Treaty. When police instituted an unofficial ban against protests around the National Diet building, Shimizu came up with a clever workaround. In the May 1960 issue of the prominent left-leaning journal Sekai, Shimizu published an article entitled "Now, More than Ever, to the Diet!" in which he proposed that instead of requesting police permission to conduct protest marches near the Diet, the anti-treaty movement should invoke an obscure clause in the postwar Japanese constitution promising an individual "right to petition" the government. Shimizu argued that as long as each person came to the Diet with an individual petition to the government, they would not have to seek a permit in advance from police. Shimizu's proposal was enacted, and served as the theoretical justification for massive protests in front of the Diet in late May and June 1960.

Shimizu was deeply disappointed by the failure of the anti-treaty movement to stop the ratification of the treaty in 1960. Thereafter, he severed his ties with progressive activists and devoted his attention to academic matters. In 1980, he shocked his former compatriots by publishing an essay in the right-wing magazine Shokun! demanding that Japan eliminate the pacifist Article 9 from its constitution, develop nuclear weapons, and return to the emperor-centric nationalism of the prewar era. This was viewed by many as a dramatic volte-face and even a betrayal. However, historian Nick Kapur argues that Shimizu's positions had a certain consistency in that they were all grounded in nationalism and a desire for Japan to be a strong, independent nation.

References

1907 births
1988 deaths
University of Tokyo alumni
Academic staff of Gakushuin University
Japanese sociologists